Mhluzi is a township just west of the large farming and industrial town Middelburg, Mpumalanga in the South African province of Mpumalanga.

It has 8 primary schools and 6 secondary.

Background and History

The Town Councils of Middelburg and Mhluzi, as well as the Management Committees for Eastdene (Indian area) and Nasaret (Coloured area according to apartheid laws) amalgamated during 1994 to form the Transitional Local Council for Middelburg.

Middelburg was the first town in Mpumalanga to amalgamate in terms of the Local Government Transition Act, and the proclamation to establish the new TLC appeared in the Mpumalanga Provincial Gazette, No 2/1994 on 16 November 1994.

Education

Primary schools
Manyano Primary School
Thušanang Primary School
Mvuzo Primary School
Mhluzi Primary School
Elusindisweni Primary School
Makhathini Primary School
Tshwenyane Combined School
Bonginkosi primary school

Secondary schools
Sozama Secondary School
Sofunda Secondary School
Mphanama comprehensive high school
L.D Moetanalo high school
Ekwazini secondary school
Saint Peter Christian College

References

Populated places in the Steve Tshwete Local Municipality
Townships in Mpumalanga